On 20 March 2022, Russian Armed Forces bombed Art School No. 12 in Mariupol, where hundreds of people were taking shelter during the Russian invasion of Ukraine.

Background 
On 24 February, the Russian Armed Forces, working together with pro-Russian rebels, besieged the port city of Mariupol, leading to heavy casualties as supplies such as food, gas, and electricity were cut off from the locals. The deputy mayor of Mariupol, Sergiy Orlov has estimated that 80to90% of the city had been destroyed due to shelling.  local authorities have estimated that at least 2,300 people were killed during the siege up until the bombing.

Bombing 
On 20 March 2022, Ukrainian authorities announced that Russian troops had bombed an art school where about 400 people were sheltering. The Mariupol City Council made the announcement through the instant messaging service Telegram, highlighting that many of those sheltering in the school were women, children and elderly. However, Petro Andryushchenko, an advisor to the Mayor of Mariupol, raised the concern that there was no exact number on how many people were using the school as a refuge.

References 

2020s building bombings
Attacks on buildings and structures in 2022
Attacks on buildings and structures in Ukraine
Attacks on schools in Europe
Building bombings in Europe
March 2022 crimes in Europe
March 2022 events in Ukraine
Russian war crimes in Ukraine
Siege of Mariupol
War crimes during the 2022 Russian invasion of Ukraine
Airstrikes during the 2022 Russian invasion of Ukraine
21st-century mass murder in Ukraine
Mass murder in 2022
Attacks in Europe in 2022